International Observances denote a period to observe an issue of international interest or concern. Many of these observances have been established by the United Nations General Assembly, United Nations Economic and Social Council or World Health Organization. World Health Observances mark a period which is often used to promote an issue and mobilize for action. Below follows a list of days and months which have been denoted as health related observances.

January
 4 January - World Braille Day
 30 January - World Leprosy Day

February
World Cancer Day
World Day of the Sick
International Childhood Cancer Day
Rare Disease Day

March
World Tuberculosis Day

April
World Health Day
World Parkinson’s Awareness Day
European Patients Rights Day
World Chagas Disease Day
World Malaria Day
Testicular Cancer Awareness Month
World Immunization Week

May
European Cancer Prevention Week

June
 International Day for Protection of Children
 World Blood Donor Day
 Men’s Health Month
 National Safety Month
 International Men’s Health Week
 Men’s Health Week

July
 World Hepatitis Day

August

 First week Of August- World Breast Feeding Awareness Week

October
Breast Cancer Awareness Month
Vegetarian Awareness Month
World Mental Health Day
World Arthritis Day
World Osteoporosis Day

November
World Diabetes Day
World Antimicrobial Awareness Week

December
World AIDS Day
International Day of Epidemic Preparedness

References

 World Health Observances
World Health Observances